The UK Singles Chart is one of many music charts compiled by the Official Charts Company that calculates the best-selling singles of the week in the United Kingdom. Before 2004, the chart was only based on the sales of physical singles. This list shows singles that peaked in the Top 10 of the UK Singles Chart during 1988, as well as singles which peaked in 1987 and 1989 but were in the top 10 in 1988. The entry date is when the single appeared in the top 10 for the first time (week ending, as published by the Official Charts Company, which is six days after the chart is announced).

One-hundred and fifty-five singles were in the top ten in 1988. Nine singles from 1987 remained in the top 10 for several weeks at the beginning of the year, while "Buffalo Stance" by Neneh Cherry, "Crackers International (EP)" by Erasure, "Good Life" by Inner City, "Especially for You" by Kylie and Jason and "Loco in Acapulco" by Four Tops were both released in 1988 but did not reach their peak until 1989. "Heaven is a Place on Earth" by Belinda Carlisle and "When I Fall in Love" by Nat King Cole were the singles from 1987 to reach their peak in 1988. Twenty-nine artists scored multiple entries in the top 10 in 1988. Bros, Everything but the Girl, Jason Donovan, Kylie Minogue and Salt-n-Pepa were among the many artists who achieved their first UK charting top 10 single in 1988.

The 1987 Christmas number-one, "Always on My Mind" by Pet Shop Boys, remained at number-one for the first two weeks of 1988. The first new number-one single of the year was "Heaven Is a Place on Earth" by Belinda Carlisle. Overall, twenty different singles peaked at number-one in 1988, with Kylie Minogue (2) having the most singles hit that position.

Background

Multiple entries
One-hundred and fifty-five singles charted in the top 10 in 1988, with one-hundred and forty-three singles reaching their peak this year. Nat King Cole and Rick Astley both reached the chart with versions of "When I Fall in Love" (the former entered the chart at the end of 1987 but peaked in this year).

Twenty-nine artists scored multiple entries in the top 10 in 1988. Bros and Kylie Minogue shared the record for most top 10 hits in 1988 with five hit singles each.

Fairground Attraction were one of a number of artists with two top-ten entries, including the number-one single "Perfect". Climie Fisher, Gloria Estefan, Morrissey, Salt 'N' Pepa and Whitney Houston were among the other artists who had multiple top 10 entries in 1988.

Chart debuts
Sixty-seven artists achieved their first top 10 single in 1988, either as a lead or featured artist. Of these, nine went on to record another hit single that year: Brother Beyond, Climie Fisher, Debbie Gibson, Fairground Attraction, Inner City, Jason Donovan, S-Express, Salt-n-Pepa and Taylor Dayne. Bomb the Bass, Tiffany and Yazz (two billed as Yazz and The Plastic Population) all had two more top 10 entries in 1988. Bros and Kylie Minogue both had four other entries in their breakthrough year.

The following table (collapsed on desktop site) does not include acts who had previously charted as part of a group and secured their first top 10 solo single.

Notes
Morrissey was lead singer in the Manchester-based group The Smiths from 1982 until they disbanded in 1987. He produced his debut solo single this year, "Suedehead", which peaked at number 5, as well as the number 9-peaking follow-up "Everyday Is Like Sunday". Narada scored his only previous top 10 single, "I Shoulda Loved Ya", under his full name Narada Michael Walden.

The Timelords scored their only hit single in 1988, "Doctorin' the Tardis", under this name - they went on to future success as The KLF, one of their several other pseudonyms. Gloria Estefan was credited as a solo artist alongside her group Miami Sound Machine for the first time in 1988. She would make her official solo top 10 debut with 1989's "Don't Wanna Lose You".

Songs from films
Original songs from various films entered the top 10 throughout the year. These included "That's the Way It Is" (from Coming to America) and "A Groovy Kind of Love", "Loco in Acapulco" and "Two Hearts" (Buster).

Charity singles
The charity double-A side single by Wet Wet Wet/Billy Bragg and Cara Tivey featured cover versions of two Beatles songs, lifted from the charity compilation album Sgt. Pepper Knew My Father which was put together in aid of Childline. Wet Wet Wet recorded "With a Little Help from My Friends", while Billy Bragg and Cara Tivey collaborated on "She's Leaving Home". The single peaked at number-one on 21 May 1988 (week ending), spending four weeks at the top spot.

Best-selling singles
Cliff Richard had the best-selling single of the year with "Mistletoe and Wine". The single spent six weeks in the top 10 (including four weeks at number one), sold over 500,000 copies and was certified gold by the BPI. "The Only Way Is Up" by Yazz & The Plastic Population came in second place, selling more than 400,000 copies and losing out by around 100,000 sales. Kylie Minogue's "I Should Be So Lucky", "Especially for You" from Kylie Minogue and Jason Donovan and "I Think We're Alone Now" by Tiffany made up the top five. Singles by Glenn Medeiros, Phil Collins, The Hollies, Wet Wet Wet/Billy Bragg with Cara Tivey and Womack & Womack were also in the top ten best-selling singles of the year.

Top-ten singles
Key

Entries by artist

The following table shows artists who achieved two or more top 10 entries in 1988, including singles that reached their peak in 1987 or 1989. The figures include both main artists and featured artists, while appearances on ensemble charity records are also counted for each artist.

Notes

 "Especially for You" reached its peak of number-one on 7 January 1989 (week ending).
 "The Only Way Is Up" and "Doctorin' the House" were both credited to Yazz & The Plastic Population, while "Stand Up for Your Love Rights" simply to Yazz.
 "Good Life" reached its peak of number four on 7 January 1989 (week ending).
 "Buffalo Stance" reached its peak of number three on 14 January 1989 (week ending).
 Comedian Mel Smith and singer Kim Wilde parodied their namesakes, the duo Mel and Kim, for the Comic Relief cover of "Rockin' Around the Christmas Tree". The song was recorded under the identical name, Mel & Kim.
 Released as the official single for Comic Relief in 1987.
 "When I Fall in Love" (Nat King Cole version) originally peaked at number 2 on its initial release in 1957. 
 "Gimme Hope Jo'anna" was released as a protest song against apartheid in South Africa. It was banned by the South African government when it was first recorded.
 "I Want You Back" originally peaked at number 2 upon its initial release in 1970. The song was remixed and re-released as "I Want You Back '88" in 1988.
 "Blue Monday" originally peaked at number 9 upon its initial release in 1983. The song was remixed and re-released as "Blue Monday 1988" in 1988.
 "With a Little Help from My Friends" and "She's Leaving Home" were recorded for the charity compilation album Sgt. Pepper Knew My Father, which was raising money for Childline. They were released as a double-A side single, with Wet Wet Wet responsible for the former and Billy Bragg with Cara Tivey the latter.
 "Anfield Rap (Red Machine in Full Effect) " was released by Liverpool F.C. to celebrate reaching the FA Cup Final in 1988.
 "Doctorin' the Tardis" was a mash-up of the Doctor Who theme tune with "Rock and Roll (Part Two)" by Gary Glitter. It also contained a sample of "Blockbuster!" by Sweet.
 "In the Air Tonight" originally peaked at number 2 upon its initial release in 1981. The song was remixed and re-released in 1988.
 "He Ain't Heavy, He's My Brother" originally peaked at number 3 upon its initial release in 1969. It was re-released in 1988 after being used in a television advertising campaign for Miller Lite beer.
"Lovely Day" originally peaked at number 7 upon its initial release in 1978. The song was remixed and re-released as "Lovely Day (Sunshine Mix)" in 1988.
 "One Moment in Time" was the official single for the Summer Olympics in 1988.
 "First Time" was used in a television advertising campaign for Coca-Cola in 1987.
 "Downtown" originally peaked at number 2 upon its initial release in 1964. The song was remixed and re-released (without Petula Clark's permission) as "Downtown '88" in 1988.
 Figure includes single that peaked in 1989.
 Figure includes single that peaked in 1987.
 Figure includes a top 10 hit with the group The Jackson 5.
 Figure includes single that first charted in 1987 but peaked in 1988.
 Figure includes appearance on Coldcut's "Doctorin' the House".

See also
1988 in British music
List of number-one singles from the 1980s (UK)

References
General

Specific

External links
1988 singles chart archive at the Official Charts Company (click on relevant week)
Official Top 40 best-selling songs of 1988 at the Official Charts Company

United Kingdom
Top 10 singles
1988